Oleksandr Ivanovych Baranov (born 29 April 1960 in Kyiv) is a Ukrainian professional football coach and a former player.

Career
He played 4 games in the European Cup Winners' Cup 1988–89 for FC Metalist Kharkiv.

Honours
 Soviet Top League runner-up: 1984.
 Soviet Cup winner: 1988.
 USSR Federation Cup finalist: 1987, 1989.

Personal life
His son Ivan Baranov is a professional footballer.

External links

1960 births
Living people
Footballers from Kyiv
Soviet footballers
Soviet expatriate footballers
Ukrainian footballers
Ukrainian expatriate footballers
Expatriate footballers in Finland
SC Tavriya Simferopol players
FC Spartak Moscow players
FC Metalist Kharkiv players
Ukrainian football managers
FC Arsenal Kyiv managers
FC Kontu players
Soviet Top League players
Association football midfielders
Soviet expatriate sportspeople in Finland
Ukrainian expatriate sportspeople in Finland